Konik is a surname. Notable people with the surname include:

Michael Konik, American author, television personality, jazz singer, improvisational comedian, blackjack player and poker player.
George Konik (1937-2016), American professional ice hockey player
Anna Konik (born 1974), Polish artist whose work includes installations, objects, video, photography and drawings
Konstantin Konik (1873–1936), Estonian politician and surgeon, member of the Estonian Salvation Committee

See also
Connick

Polish-language surnames